Brandon Robinson  (born 25 February 1995) is a Dutch footballer who plays as a forward for ASWH. He has previously played for FC Den Bosch and NAC Breda.

Career
Rotterdam-born Robinson began his professional career in 2014 when he signed terms with NAC Breda, after being let go by Feyenoord as a youngster. He would go on to make only 4 appearances over two seasons before being released in the summer of 2016. He signed a one-year deal with FC Den Bosch playing 24 times and scoring once during the 2016-17 season.

On 12 July 2017 he joined English League Two side  Grimsby Town on trial, scoring in a 4-0 friendly victory against Scunthorpe United before netting the winner in a 2-1 victory against Barnsley.

He signed with SVV Scheveningen in September 2017. In March 2019, he moved to VV Katwijk. In 2021, he joined the ranks of Excelsior Maassluis and in 2022, ASWH. On Wednesday, 21 September 2022, Robonson scored and equalizer against Kozakken Boys in the national cup. ASWH still lost.

References

External links
 

1995 births
Association football midfielders
Dutch footballers
Eredivisie players
Eerste Divisie players
Tweede Divisie players
NAC Breda players
FC Den Bosch players
Footballers from Rotterdam
Living people
SVV Scheveningen players
VV Katwijk players
XerxesDZB players
Feyenoord players
ASWH players
Excelsior Maassluis players
Derde Divisie players